Sietland is a former Samtgemeinde ("collective municipality") in the district of Cuxhaven, in Lower Saxony, Germany. It was situated in the historical Land of Hadeln approx. 20 km southeast of Cuxhaven. Its seat was in the village Ihlienworth. On 1 January 2011 it merged with the Samtgemeinde Hadeln to form the new Samtgemeinde Land Hadeln.

The Samtgemeinde Sietland consisted of the following municipalities:

 Ihlienworth
 Odisheim 
 Steinau 
 Wanna

References

Cuxhaven (district)
Former Samtgemeinden in Lower Saxony